Migmatocephala is a clade of placoderm fish within the suborder Brachythoraci. Migmatocephala includes the homostiids Taemasosteus?, Tityosteus, Antineosteus, Atlantidosteus, and Homosteus.

Phylogeny 
The cladogram shown here is based on "A new species of Atlantidosteus Lelièvre, 1984 (Placodermi, Arthrodira, Brachythoraci) from the Middle Devonian of the Broken River area (Queensland, Australia)".

References 

Fossil taxa described in 1995
Arthrodires